Edward Bartlett (1836–1908) was an English ornithologist.

Edward Bartlett may also refer to:

Barto Bartlett (Edward Lawson Bartlett, 1906–1976), West Indian cricketer
Bob Bartlett (Edward Lewis Bartlett, 1904–1968), U.S. senator from Alaska
Statue of Bob Bartlett
Edward T. Bartlett (1841–1910), New York lawyer